Honeycombing or "honeycomb lung" is the radiological appearance seen with widespread fibrosis and is defined by the presence of small cystic spaces with irregularly thickened walls composed of fibrous tissue. Dilated and thickened terminal and respiratory bronchioles produce cystic airspaces, giving honeycomb appearance on chest x-ray. Honeycomb cysts often predominate in the peripheral and pleural/subpleural lung regions regardless of their cause.

Subpleural honeycomb cysts typically occur in several contiguous layers. This finding can allow honeycombing to be distinguished from paraseptal emphysema in which subpleural cysts usually occur in a single layer.

References

Lung disorders